Abdullah Yiğiter (born 20 February 2000), is a Turkish professional footballer who plays as a goalkeeper for TFF First League club Çaykur Rizespor on loan from Hatayspor.

Professional career
A youth product of Diyarbakir DSI Spor and Amed, Yiğiter began his career as the reserve goalkeeper at Amed, Fenerbahçe and İstanbulspor. He returned to Amed SK in 2020, where he was their starter in the TFF Second League. On 30 June 2021, he transferred to the Süper Lig club Hatayspor. He made his professional debut with Hatayspor in a 3–1 Süper Lig loss to Kasımpaşa on 8 January 2022.

Personal life
Abdullah is the son of Murat Yiğiter, who was also a professional football goalkeeper in Turkey.

References

External links
 

2000 births
Living people
Sportspeople from Diyarbakır
Turkish footballers
Hatayspor footballers
İstanbulspor footballers
Fenerbahçe S.K. footballers
Süper Lig players
TFF Second League players
Association football goalkeepers